Fontinalis is a genus of submerged aquatic mosses belonging to the subclass Bryidae. These mosses are also called fountain moss, brook moss and water moss. The genus is widespread in the Northern Hemisphere and includes both species that occur in still water and in flowing water.

Species
Incomplete list of species:
Fontinalis antipyretica
Fontinalis dalecarlica
Fontinalis duriaei
Fontinalis flaccida
Fontinalis hypnoides
Fontinalis neomexicana
Fontinalis novae-angliae
Fontinalis squamosa

References 

Hypnales
Freshwater plants
Moss genera